Prince Marama Teururai later known as Regent Marama (17 December 1851 – 7 June 1909) was a member of a Tahitian royal family (House of Teururai) which reigned on the Tahitian island of Huahine during the 19th century.

He was designated as a crown prince of Huahine when his father became king of Huahine in 1852. He never became king of Huahine.

Biography
Prince Marama Teururai was born at Huahine in 1851.

He was the second son of King Ari'imate. His mother, Princess Maerehia Teha'apapa of Raiatea, was the only living child of King Tamatoa IV of Raiatea. She became Queen regnant of Huahine under the reign name of Teha'apapa II after her husband was deposed in 1868.

Regency 
He succeeded his younger brother as prime minister to their mother Queen Teha'apapa in 1884. He acted also as Regent from 1884 to 1895.

He accepted the French protectorate on the kingdom in 1890, became regent from 1893 to 1895 to his eldest daughter Queen Teha'apapa, the last sovereign.
 
He finally signed the annexation of his State in favor of France which annexed his kingdom on 1897.

Marriage and issue 
He married Princess Tetuamarama of Rurutu (1857–1919) (eldest daughter of the King Teuruarii III of Rurutu and his wife Tematarurai'i) and had eight children but only three of them let a descendant:

 Tehaapapa III – Last Queen of Huahine
 Her Highness Princess Teanuinuiata – she had ten legitimate children
 Her Highness Princess Tetuamarama – she had six legitimate children
 
Their children remain the pretendant to the royal family of Huahine since the end of the monarchy on this island.

Regent Marama died at Huahine in 1909.

Ancestry

See also
French Polynesia
Annexation of the Leeward Islands
List of monarchs of Huahine
List of monarchs of Tahiti
List of monarchs who lost their thrones in the 19th century

References

External links and sources
 Tahiti, les temps et les pouvoirs. Pour une anthropologie historique du Tahiti post-européen, Paris, ORSTOM, 543 p., Jean-François BARE.
 Trois ans chez les Canaques. Odyssée d'un Neuchâtelois autour du monde. Lausanne, Payot & C° Éditeurs, 342p., Eugène HANNI.
 Tahiti aux temps anciens (traduction française de Bertrand Jaunez, Pars, Musée de l'Homme, Société des Océanistes, 671p. (édition originale Ancient Tahiti, Honolulu 1928) de Teuira Henry.

1851 births
1909 deaths
Huahine royalty
Regents
Heirs apparent who never acceded
Sons of kings